Dalola is one of the 51 union councils (sub-divisions) of Abbottabad District in Khyber-Pakhtunkhwa province of Pakistan.

Location 
Dalola is located at 34°21'20N 73°23'50E and has an average elevation of 798 metres (2621 ft).
Dalola is the most north-eastern part of the district, it borders U.C Karnol & Garhi Habibullah of Mansehra District to the north and the River Kunhar and Muzaffarabad District of Kashmir to the east. To the south lies U.C Boi and to the west situated Tarnawai (U.C Banda Pir Khan). It was hit quite badly by the 2005 Pakistan earthquake.

Subdivisions
The union council is subdivided into the following areas:
 Malik Ghulam Ali Khan Town 
 Awan Abad
 Hoter Awanabad sector 2
 Batangaw Awanabad sector 3
 Gran Awanabad sector 4
 Sehri
 Pindhi
 Kachar
 Kalgran
 Darrah
 Dhora
 Dabban
 Dalola
 Naroka
 Mujffah
 Dogranina
 Sirla / Hadora
 Malkan Gali
 Changli
choli
 Tarkot

History
Dalola is named after Sikh which indicates Sikh presence in the area during early 19th century. However their presence was nominal as all the surrounding hills were occupied by Muslim tribes. When Sikh lost their territories all our Hazara and Punjab during Anglo Sikh war (1845–46) they were either killed by hill tribes or narrowly escaped from their persecution. These tribes captured and divided lands among themselves and which they still hold. During British rule the area remain semi independent paying revenue like rest of Hazara tribes and despite many attempts by Khan of Garhi and Sultan of Boi to capture Dalola, it was never subdued or came under their influence.

Tribes

Main tribes residing in Dalola are Dhund Abbasi, Awan and Malik.  Some other tribes like  Karlal, Satti with few Syed, Sarrara (Qureshis), Raja families also reside in the village and also some village artisans and menials. Abbasi tribe is further subdivided into Meriwal, Charwal, Tatial )and  Awan's subtribe is Bagwal, Alvi, malik, khan. Nearby villages are Awanabad ( Malik Gulam Ali Khan town) Mujafa, Hadora, Dara, Daban, Garang, Sehali, Hoter (Awanabad sector 2) Pindi, Burj, Bai (Mohallah Sardar Pir Khan) Bholu di Seri, Gran (Awanabad sector 3) Batangan (Abbasi family), Islampura, Danna,  Gali Malkhan (Malik abbasi family),Changli (satti tribe) and many more.

Notable people
Malik Didar Ali Khan Awan Founder of Dalola (Bani e Azadi e Dalola )
Nambardar Malik Gulam Ali Khan ( tiger of Awans)
Namberdar Malik Fatah Ali khan Awan,
Mohammad Pervez Awan (Superintendent Pakistan Customs)
Malik Mohammad Iqbal khan Awan, Malik Gulam Rabani Khan Awan,Mohammad Mubarrak  Awan,
Malik Faroq Ali Khan Awan, Arshad Ali Awan 
Amjad Ali Awan, 
Malik Khushal Khan Awan,
(Late Mufti Muhammad Ilyas)
Gohr Rehman Abbasi Ex EDO Abbottabad 
Maj General (R) Tariq Abbasi, 
Col Talat iqbal khan (Army officer GHQ)
Maj Kawar abbasi (Army Officer ISPR, GHQ)
Maj shafqat Abbasi (Army officer),
Arshid Abbasi (PMS officer) 
Sardar pir Khan.

Haji Sarwar Abbasi Leader PMLN Dalola
M Professor Hanif Abbasi Leader PMLN Dalola
Prof (R) M Ayub Abbasi  Leader Jamiat UL Ulama e Islam F & EX Candidate PK 45
Malik Zaheer Abbasi District member UC Dalola, Danish malik ( journalist)
Malik Mubarak Abbasi Leader PTI Dalola 
Sabar Abbasi PMLN Hadora 
Molana Abdullah Abbasi Tehsil Member 
Qazi Shafiq UR Rehman 
Abdul Qayyum ex Principal GHS Dalola
Fayaz sb ex Principal GHS Dalola
Irshad Abbasi Garang VC Chairman 
Parvez Abbasi (Shaeed) Sehali 
Sardar Abdul Qayyum Abbasi Hadora (L)
Haji Abdul Ghani Abbasi (L)
Muhammad Riaz Abbasi PMLN
Babar Abbasi (Mechanical Engineer) Jamat e islami uc Dalola Pk.45
Shaukat Ali Abbasi Leader Jamiat UL ulama e Islam F.
  HBL.sardar abdul qauem of hadora, ex tehsildar Muhammad Ismail of hadora.

Union councils of Abbottabad District

fr:Dalola